Omalium is a genus of ocellate rove beetles in the family Staphylinidae. There are at least 70 described species in Omalium.

Species
These 74 species belong to the genus Omalium:

 Omalium algarum Casey, 1885 g
 Omalium allardii Fairmaire & Brisout de Barneville, 1859 g
 Omalium amicale Gistel, 1857 g
 Omalium asturicum Fauvel, 1900 g
 Omalium atrum Heer, 1839 g
 Omalium blattoides Guérin-Méneville, 1829 g
 Omalium brevipenne Motschulsky, 1860 g
 Omalium bulgaricum Zerche, 1988 g
 Omalium caesum Gravenhorst, 1806 g
 Omalium cantabricum Coiffait, 1966 g
 Omalium cerrutii Zanetti, 1985 g
 Omalium chinese Li & Chen, 1993 c g
 Omalium cinnamomeum Kraatz, 1857 g
 Omalium collare Lentz, 1856 g
 Omalium crassicorne Lea, 1906 g
 Omalium cribrum b
 Omalium cursor Gravenhorst, 1806 g
 Omalium denticolle Sharp, 1889 g
 Omalium deubeli Bernhauer, 1915 g
 Omalium doderoi Zanetti, 1980 g
 Omalium escayraci Saulcy, 1864 g
 Omalium espanoli Jarrige, 1952 g
 Omalium excavatum Stephens, 1834 g
 Omalium exiguum Gyllenhal, 1810 g
 Omalium ferrugineum Kraatz, 1857 g
 Omalium foraminosum Méklin, 1852 g
 Omalium fractum b
 Omalium funebre Fauvel, 1871 g
 Omalium fuscum Stephens, 1834 g
 Omalium henroti Coiffait, 1976 g
 Omalium hilare Gistel, 1857 g
 Omalium holtzi Bernhauer, 1943 g
 Omalium hypsibioticum Gistel, 1857 g
 Omalium imhoffii Heer, 1839 g
 Omalium imitator Luze, 1906 g
 Omalium italicum Bernhauer, 1902 g
 Omalium laeviusculum Gyllenhal, 1827 g
 Omalium laticolle Kraatz, 1857 g
 Omalium latum Stephens, 1834 g
 Omalium littorale Kraatz, 1858 g
 Omalium lokayi Fleischer, 1897 g
 Omalium longicorne Luze, 1906 c g
 Omalium marginatum Say, 1832 g
 Omalium mesomelas Holme, 1842 g
 Omalium monticulum Grimmer, 1841 g
 Omalium muensteri Bernhauer, 1900 g
 Omalium nigriceps Kiesenwetter, 1850 g
 Omalium nigrum Gravenhorst, 1806 g
 Omalium ocellatum Wollaston, 1854 g
 Omalium oxyacanthae Gravenhorst, 1806 c g
 Omalium plagiatum Mannerheim, 1843 g
 Omalium poggii Zanetti, 1985 g
 Omalium punicantipenne Grimmer, 1841 g
 Omalium pygmaeum Gravenhorst, 1806 g
 Omalium quadripenne Casey, 1893 g
 Omalium repandum Erichson, 1840 g b
 Omalium riparium Thomson, 1857 g
 Omalium rivulare (Paykull, 1789) g b
 Omalium robustum Broun, 1911 g
 Omalium rufum Sachse, 1852 g
 Omalium rugatum Mulsant & Rey, 1880 g
 Omalium rugulipenne Rye, 1864 g
 Omalium saulcyi Fauvel, 1875 g
 Omalium scabrum Smetana, 1975 c g
 Omalium sculpticolle Wollaston, 1864 g
 Omalium septentrionis Thomson, 1857 g
 Omalium sorbi Gyllenhal, 1810 g
 Omalium striatum Gravenhorst, 1802 g
 Omalium strigicolle Wankowicz, 1869 c g
 Omalium subrugosum Stephens, 1834 g
 Omalium subsolanum Herman, 2001 c g
 Omalium testaceum Gravenhorst, 1806 g
 Omalium validum Kraatz, 1858 g
 Omalium xambeui Fauvel, 1876 g

Data sources: i = ITIS, c = Catalogue of Life, g = GBIF, b = Bugguide.net

References

Further reading

External links

 

Omaliinae